Lee Jun-ho (born January 25, 1990), simply known as Junho, is a South Korean singer, songwriter, dancer, composer and actor. He is a member of the South Korean boy band 2PM.
 
As a soloist he releases two Korean studio albums, two Japanese albums, one Korean extended play, seven Japanese extended plays and fourteen singles.

Studio albums

Extended plays

Singles

Original soundtrack

Compositions

References

Discographies of South Korean artists